J. E. B. Stuart Elementary School can mean:

 J. E. B. Stuart Elementary School. Norfolk, Virginia; now closed

It is also the former name of these schools:

 Barack Obama Elementary School, Richmond, Virginia
 Pleasants Lane Elementary, Petersburg, Virginia